The discography of the American blues rock band Alabama Shakes consists of two studio albums, eight singles, and two extended plays (EPs). The band consists of Brittany Howard (lead vocals and rhythm guitar), Heath Fogg (lead guitar and vocals), Zac Cockrell (bass guitar) and Steve Johnson (drums, vocals, and percussion).

Albums

Studio albums

Extended plays

Singles

Other charting songs

Other appearances

Music videos

Notes

References

Discographies of American artists